Benoît Graffin (born 14 August 1966) is a French screenwriter and film director. In 1998 he won a development grant for Café de la plage in the Montpellier Mediterranean Film Festival.

Filmography 
As a writer:
The Trouble With You (2018)
Open at Night (2016)
The African Doctor (2016)
Encore heureux (2016) Also director
De vrais mensonges (2010)
La fille de Monaco (2008)
Priceless (2006)
Les ambitieux (2006)
Après vous... (2003)
Café de la plage (2001) Also director
Le New Yorker (1998) Also director

References

External links 

French film directors
1966 births
Living people
French screenwriters